Lignosus rhinocerus, commonly known as tiger milk mushroom, belongs to family Polyporaceae in the division Basidiomycota. This fungus is geographically distributed only in tropical rainforests in the region of South China, Thailand, Malaysia, Indonesia, Philippines and Papua New Guinea.

In Malaysia, the tiger milk mushroom is more often known as "Cendawan Susu Rimau". It has been used in traditional medicine.

History
The tiger milk mushroom was first reported in the West in 1664 when a European government agent was given this product upon sailing to the South East Asian Region. According to The Diary of John Evelyn (Publication dated 22 June 1664), this mushroom was named ‘Lac tygridis’, meaning "tiger’s milk". In his publication, Evelyn also recorded that this fungus was used by the local people to treat diseases for which European doctors found no cure. 
In 1890, Sir Henry Nicholas Ridley, the father of Malaya’s rubber industry, recorded that this fungus was an important medicinal mushroom used by local communities. He even attempted to cultivate it but failed. In the same year, this fungus was scientifically documented by Mordecai Cubitt Cooke who named it as Fomes rhinocerotis based on a specimen found in Penang. Today, it is known by the scientific name Lignosus rhinocerus.

Botanical description
Lignosus rhinocerus has a centrally stipulate pileus .  That's simply a mushroom cap which grows at the end of a stipe (stem) arising from a district buried tuber or sclerotium. Unlike most other type of mushrooms, this fungus has unique growth habit. Their growth is solitary, and can find only one fruit body at a time. This species is classified as precious and rare due to the uniqueness of the solitary growth habit, and the distance between one fruit body and another is not less than 5 km.

In folklore, tiger milk mushrooms are said to emerge from the spot where the milk of a tigress was left on the ground during nursing. The underground fungus has sclerotia can only be seen when the mushroom sprouts.

Claimed benefits

A 2018 review of the testing of investigations into Lignosus rhinocerotis concluded that "there is a paucity of validation studies including human clinical trials of the mycochemicals of L. rhinocerotis."

Aboriginal people boil it with Tongkat ali to be used as general tonic.

Research

Research findings have revealed that tiger milk mushroom sclerotia contain various phytochemicals, such as polysaccharides, polysaccharides-protein complexes, and β-glucan.

Cultivation

The mushroom was successfully cultivated using solid fermentation technology.

References

External links

Polyporaceae
Fungi described in 1879
Fungi of Asia
Fungi of New Guinea
Medicinal fungi
Taxa named by Mordecai Cubitt Cooke